Anematichthys armatus is a species of freshwater cyprinid native to Southeast Asia.

References 

Cyprinid fish of Asia
Fish described in 1842